Portrait of Procurator Jacopo Soranzo is a 1550 oil on canvas by Tintoretto, now in the Gallerie dell'Accademia. A larger portrait of the Soranzo with his family also survives, now divided into three parts, all the Pinacoteca del Castello Sforzesco in Milan.

References

Soranzo
Soranzo
1550 paintings
Paintings in the Gallerie dell'Accademia
Paintings by Tintoretto